Selwyn College may refer to the following:

In England
 Selwyn College, Cambridge

In New Zealand
 Selwyn College, Auckland
 Selwyn College, Otago